Bethesda is a hamlet in York Region, Ontario, Canada, in the town of Whitchurch-Stouffville. The hamlet is centred at the intersection of Warden Avenue and Bethesda Road in the south-eastern region of Whitchurch-Stouffville; it flourished around 1875.

The community gained distinction with the formation of a private telephone company, the Bethesda and Stouffville Telephone Association in 1904, with 1188 users from Newmarket to Markham by 1930. The entire system was purchased by Bell Telephone in 1960.

References

Communities in Whitchurch-Stouffville